A lonely hearts killer (or want-ad killer) is a criminal who commits murder by contacting a victim who has either posted advertisements to or answered advertisements via newspaper classified ads and personal or lonely hearts ads.

Varied motives
The actual motivations of these criminals are varied. By definition, a killing will have taken place in as much as the suspected, accused, or convicted perpetrator has been dubbed a want-ad or lonely hearts killer. However, the crime may have involved a simple robbery gone wrong, an elaborate insurance fraud scheme, sexual violence/rape, or any of several other ritualized pathological impulses (e.g. necrophilia, mutilation, cannibalism, etc.). Sometimes murder is not the (original) intent, but becomes a by-product of rape or other struggle; in some cases, murder is committed simply to cover up the original crime. Some, on the other hand, are serial killers who utilize this method of targeting victims, either exclusively, or when it suits them.

Notable lonely hearts and want-ad killers
The following accused and convicted murderers and serial killers are known to have used want ads, personal ads, and/or matrimonial bureaus to contact their victims:

 Harvey Carignan (1927–2023) – known as "the want-ad killer"
 Nannie Doss (1905–1965) – known as "The Lonely Hearts Killer," among other names
 Amelia Dyer (1836–1897) – known as "The Ogress of Reading"
 Raymond Fernandez (1914–1951) and Martha Beck (1920–1951) – known as "the honeymoon killers" and "the lonely hearts killers" 
 Albert Fish (1870–1936)
 Harvey Glatman (1927–1959) – known as "the lonely hearts killer"
 Denis Gorbunov (1977–2006)
 Belle Gunness (1859–1908?) – she became part of American criminal folklore, a female Bluebeard.
 Robert Hansen (1939–2014)
 Béla Kiss (1877–19?)
 Henri Désiré Landru (1869–1922)
 Elfriede Blauensteiner (1931–2003) – known as "the Black Widow"
 Bobby Joe Long (1953–2019) – known as "the classified ad rapist"
 Philip Markoff (1986–2010) – known as "the Craigslist killer"
 Harry Powers (1892–1932) – known as "the lonely hearts killer", "the West Virginia Bluebeard", and "the butcher of Clarksburg"
 Sheila LaBarre (b. 1959) – serving two consecutive life sentences for two murders on farm she inherited from deceased husband. Boyfriend later died, as did a man who replied to her personal ad.

Lonely hearts killers in popular culture
The theme of the want-ad killer or lonely hearts murderer has been popular in fiction. Examples of dramatic treatments of this theme are listed in chronological order of publication or release:

 Pièges (1939) is a French thriller film directed by Robert Siodmak, starring Maurice Chevalier, Marie Déa, and André Brunot.  It tells the story of an amateur female sleuth who goes undercover to trap a serial killer who has murdered one of her friends and who stalks his prey via classified ads.
 "The Want-Ad Murders", a novella by Frances M. Deegan, appeared in Detective Story Magazine in March 1944, and was reprinted in Detective Story Annual 1948, edited by Daisy Bacon, and published by Street & Smith in 1948.
 Lured is a 1947 film featuring a serial killer who uses newspaper personal ads to select his victims. Known as Personal Column in its UK release, this United Artists film was directed by Douglas Sirk and starred Lucille Ball, George Sanders, Boris Karloff, Charles Coburn, and Cedric Hardwicke.
 Monsieur Verdoux is a 1947 film written by, directed by, and starring Charlie Chaplin, and based on the life of the French lonely hearts killer Henri Désiré Landru.
 The Night of the Hunter (1953) is a novel based loosely on lonely hearts killer Harry Powers. In 1992, the film made from the novel (1955) was deemed "culturally, historically, or aesthetically significant" by the United States Library of Congress and was selected for preservation in the National Film Registry.
 Bluebeard's Ten Honeymoons is a 1960 film that starred George Sanders as Henri Désiré Landru.
 Landru is a 1963 film, directed by Claude Chabrol and inspired by the Henri Désiré Landru case.
 A special two-hour episode of the 1967-70 revival of Dragnet, filmed in 1966 as the pilot for the new series but not aired until 1969 during the third season, was based on the Harvey Glatman case.
 The Honeymoon Killers is a 1970 film fictionalization of the murders committed by Raymond Fernandez and Martha Beck.
 Sea of Love is a 1989 film drama in which a series of male murder victims are discovered to have each submitted ads in rhyme  for publication in the lonely hearts column of the same magazine. The police detective on the case convinces his chief to write rhyming ads for the magazine and to investigate any women who reply.
2Shy is a 1995 episode of The X-Files which features a mutant man, Virgil Encanto, who romances his victims in online chat rooms before harvesting their body fat.
Deep Crimson, a 1996 Mexican movie directed by Arturo Ripstein, was an adaptation of the story of Ray Fernandez and Martha Beck.
Method is a film released in 2004, inspired by and loosely based on the Belle Gunness murders.
 Désiré Landru, a 2005 French movie, was an adaptation of the story of Henri Désiré Landru.
 Lonely Hearts is a 2006 dramatized film account of the killings perpetrated by Ray Fernandez and Martha Beck.
 Cold Case, Season Four, Episode Nine, entitled "Lonely Hearts", was also based on Ray Fernandez and Martha Beck.

See also
Internet homicide
Internet suicide
Murder of Margaret Martin

References

Crime
Interpersonal relationships
Killings by type